Furskins was a series of plush toy bears in different sizes and guises created by Xavier Roberts in the 1980s. Furskins are a highly collectible item, yet are not as highly sought by collectors as Robert's most notable creation Cabbage Patch Kids.

Background
Created by Xavier Roberts, Furskins were produced by Panosh Place, Roberts’s Original Appalachian Artworks and Coleco from 1983 to the late 1980s.

The Furskins Bear series
Each Furskins Bear had its own unique attire, name and character background story in the valley of Moody Hollow. Bear sizes were styled into two main types, with a novel third. A set of 8 original five-inch posable bears began the series, followed by a second set of 8 five-inch posable bears out of popular demand. A subsequent set of 16 twenty two-inch bears were created as the demand for the toy grew. The Furskins series was rounded out by the addition of 6 small bears. Four special collectible bears were created for and sold at Wendy's for $1.99 during the 1980s.
 
Additional clothing was available for Furskins, as were playsets, for collectors to own. Playsets included the Moody Hollow Express and Moody Hollow General Store.

Furskins Bear character names
Each Furskin hailed from Moody Hollow and had a unique look to match the character's story.  Some popular Furskins characters were:

 Selma Jean Furskin—the Possum Queen of Moody Hollow has a ribbon attached crown, sash, pants and shoes.
 Hattie Furskin—"the pie baker of Moody Hollow" Peach multi colored dress with blue ribbon.
 Dudley Furskin—"the general store manager" striped overalls and scarf.
 Cecelia Furskin—middle sized red fur, red and white plaid shirt with lace. Denim dress and cowboy hat.
 Fannie Fay Furskin—"School Marm" pale pink print dress, solid pale pink pinafore, dark pink stretch stockings.
 Boon Furskin—"the sweet-toothed beekeeper" straw hat, bug net, bees, flannel shirt and khakis.
 J. Livingston Clayton Furskin—middle sized - tracker explorer aka Scout - Camo and hunting cap.
 Persimmon Furskin—middle sized baker's assistant. Light blue dress flowers apron with two pockets and headband.
 Bubba Furskin—middle sized best tater farmer (sweet) east of Idaho. Blue overalls, red long johns and bandanna.
 Hank "Spitball" Furskin—middle sized, baseball hat, red.
 Baby Thistle Furskin—middle sized, diapers.
 Junie Mae Furskin—middle sized square dancer in blue polka dot dress, lace slip and yellow ribbon.
 Farrell Furskin -- "the Moody Hollow Postmaster" hat, flannel shirt and "trademark bowtie".
 Humphrey Furskin—blue (or other colored) tee-shirt.
 CeCe Furskin
 Debonaire Bear
 Jam Furskin
 Wizards
 Coleco 1st 8 issue: Orville T (aviator) Jedgar (sheriff) Selma Jean (possum queen) Fannie Faye (school marm) Boone (bee keeper) Farrell (postmaster) Dudley Furskin (store manager) Hattie (baker)
 Coleco 2nd 8 issue: Bubba (potato farmer) Cecelia (handywoman) Hank “Spitball” (baseball player) June Mae (squaredancer) Lila Claire Persimmon (baker’s assistant) J Livingstone Clayton “Scout” (scout) Thistle (the baby)
 Wendy’s Furskins Bears: Farrell, Hattie, Boone, Dudley
 Panosh Place Furskins: Dudley, Boone, Farrell, Hattie, Bubba, Cece, Lila Claire, Thistle, Persimmon, Hank Spitball, Jedgar, Junie Mae, Scout, Orville T., Selma Jean
 Hide and Seek Furskins (Baby Furskins): Molasses, Jam, Flour, Sugar, Candy, Honey

Collectability
Xavier Roberts's Furskins vary in collector value depending on condition and desirability.

References

Teddy bears
Doll brands